Cheadle and Marple Sixth Form College is a training provider for the Stockport (Greater Manchester) area specialising in 16–19 educational provision. It consists of two colleges, The Cheadle College and Marple Sixth Form College, which have a combined student population of nearly 2,000.

Structure
 The Cheadle College, Cheadle Road, Cheadle Hulme, Greater Manchester. SK8 5HA
 Marple Sixth Form College, Buxton Lane, Marple, Stockport. SK6 7QY

Ofsted
The college was inspected by Ofsted in March 2014 and September 2016 and received 'Good' grades on both occasions. In the latest report, Ofsted commented that 'the principal and senior leadership team have successfully promoted a culture of high expectations and high standards of teaching, learning and assessment', and 'learners demonstrate a high level of respect for each other and for their teachers.'

Admissions
The college offers a very wide range of courses, including GCSEs (General Certificate of Secondary Education), AS (Advanced Subsidiary Level) and A-Levels (GCE Advanced Level), vocational NVQs and BTECs. They also offer Access courses for adults.

History

Moseley Hall County Grammar School
In 1946, following the Education Act 1944, a building known as Moseley Hall on Wilmslow Road was acquired by the local authority for £6,500. Moseley Hall had been owned by John Henry Davies, President of Manchester United Football Club, since 1904. His widow, who lived at Bramall Hall till 1935, re-purchased Moseley Hall at some point after his death in 1927. 
During the war the building was used for four years as the National Fire Service headquarters for Manchester. It was converted into a grammar school, which took its name from the building it occupied. It was run by the Cheadle and Wilmslow Educational Executive of Cheshire Education Committee. It was situated north-west down the road (A5149) from the current campus, and bordered neighbouring Cheadle. It was originally co-educational. The first headmaster was Wilfred Simms, aged 34.

Cheadle County Grammar School for Girls

In January 1956 a new school was built where the current Cheadle campus is today and this became Cheadle County Grammar School for Girls. Moseley Hall therefore became a boys-only school. The girls' school had around 950 girls and was situated on Cheadle Road (A5149).

Cheadle Moseley Grammar School for Boys
In 1970, a new school was built adjacent to the girls' school on North Downs Road. It cost £370,000, and became known as Cheadle Moseley Boys' Grammar School with 900 boys. The two schools, whilst next to each other, remained separate, despite plans to merge them. Moseley Hall was eventually demolished in the late 1970s and replaced by the Village Hotel and an entertainment complex. The boys' school at one time had its own railway line.

Manor County Secondary School
The schools were eventually merged in 1983 and became known as The Manor County Secondary School, a comprehensive school. It was the first state comprehensive to take the International Baccalaureate in 1990.

Margaret Danyers FE College
In 1991 it was converted into a college of further education; the girls' school became known as the Bulkley Building, and the boys' school became the Moseley Building. Initially the college was called Margaret Danyers College on North Downs Road. In the early 1990s, Stockport replaced its school sixth forms with separate sixth form colleges. Margaret Danyers started at the age of 14 and was effectively an upper school, not just a sixth form college. The Cheadle Adult Centre was next door.

Ridge Danyers College
The Marple Campus was initially called Marple Ridge College; Marple Ridge High School had closed in 1989. In 1995 Margaret Danyers College and Marple Ridge College combined to become Ridge Danyers College with two campuses. There were some problems with the Cheadle Campus as part of the Moseley building was declared unsafe in the early 1990s due to the decay of the reinforced concrete with which it was constructed. This building was eventually demolished in August 2000, and replaced by a new building.

Cheadle and Marple Sixth Form College
In October 2004 the college changed its name to CAMSFC (Cheadle and Marple Sixth Form College). It was the largest further education college in the country in 2004, with around 9001 students.

In 2016, Marple Sixth Form College completed an extension and refurbishment of the Buxton Lane site, enabling all provision to be based at one site. New facilities included a sports hall, science labs and a learning resource centre.

Alumni

Cheadle and Marple Sixth Form College
 Qasim Akhtar, actor
Tom Ogden, Joe Donovan and Myles Kellock from the indie pop band Blossoms

Ridge Danyers Sixth Form College
Owen Jones, socialist commentator, author of Chavs: The Demonization of the Working Class
Councillor Greg Stanton, Elected Member for Didsbury West ward on Manchester City Council 
Dame Sarah Storey, 14-time gold medal winning Paralympian
Wyl Menmuir, Man Booker Prize nominated author, 2016
Adio Marchant, singer, known professionally as Bipolar Sunshine and former vocalist with the Manchester band Kid British

Marple Ridge High School
 Tim Grundy, radio presenter, son of Bill Grundy
 Stephanie Tague, actress in Coronation Street
 Kaye Wragg, actress, played Diane Noble in The Bill

Moseley Hall County Grammar School
 Prof Stephen Busby, Professor of Biochemistry at the University of Birmingham
 Steve Heighway, footballer
 Admiral Sir John Kerr, commanded HMS Illustrious and Second Sea Lord
 Ian Walters, chief executive of Action Mental Health (based in Northern Ireland)
 Mr Simon Lea Smith MITIE account director
 Andy Ritchie, footballer with Manchester United, Leeds United and Oldham Athletic
 Paul Bate Headmaster, The Park School, Yeovil and Emmanuel School, Oxford
 Trevor Williams (1938-2015) a British plant geneticist who was instrumental in the creation of plant gene banks.

Cheadle Girls' Grammar school
 Gwyneth Powell, actress
 Anne Smith, Lady Smith, Senator of the College of Justice

References

External links
 Cheadle and Marple Sixth Form College Website
 Moseley Hall Grammar School Web Site

Buildings and structures in the Metropolitan Borough of Stockport
Education in the Metropolitan Borough of Stockport
Sixth form colleges in Greater Manchester
Educational institutions established in 1946
1946 establishments in England